Typhoon Nida, known in the Philippines as Typhoon Vinta, was the most intense tropical cyclone worldwide in 2009. It was also the most intense tropical cyclone in the Northwest Pacific Ocean during the 2000s, tied with Jangmi in 2008.

Meteorological history

At this time the system was moving around the subtropical ridge of pressure, with an anticyclone over the cyclone helping the convection to consolidate over a broad and elongated low level circulation center which was located in an area of minimal vertical wind shear. Later that morning a Tropical Cyclone Formation Alert was released as deep convection increased in organization with multiple bands of convection starting to wrap into the developing low level circulation center. The system was then declared as a tropical depression by the JMA later that day before the JTWC followed suit early the next day, who assigned the designation of 26W to the depression. During November 22, the depression remained weak, before during the next day both the JMA and the JTWC upgraded the depression to a tropical storm, with the JMA assigning the international number of 0922 and name of Nida as it started to move along a subtropical ridge.

Later on November 23, microwave imagery showed that an eye had developed within a well defined low level circulation center. Early the next day, the JTWC reported that Nida had intensified into a category 1 typhoon as the eye became well defined with deep convection wrapping around most of the eye.

The typhoon later weakened to a category four, before re-strengthening to a category five on November 27, remaining quasi-stationary for more than two days. It weakened to a tropical depression on December 2 due to stronger vertical wind shear associated by the Northeast monsoon, and the storm dissipated on December 4.

Preparations and impact

Micronesia
Early on November 24, the National Weather Service Weather Forecast Office in Tiyan, Guam (NWS Guam) placed the island of Faraulep under a tropical storm warning, before later that morning issuing tropical storm watches for Fais and Ulithi. As Nida was upgraded to a typhoon by the JTWC, the NWS upgraded the tropical storm warning for Faraulep to a typhoon warning. Later that day they reported that the typhoon warning for Faraulep had been cancelled as Nida was moving to the northwest away from Faraulep before early the next day the tropical storm warning for Fais and Ulithi were cancelled.

See also

 Typhoon Mitag (2002)
 Typhoon Jangmi (2008)
 Typhoon Lekima (2013)
 Typhoon Halong (2019)

References

External links

RSMC Tokyo – Typhoon Center
Best Track Data of Typhoon Nida (0922) 
Best Track Data (Graphics) of Typhoon Nida (0922)
Best Track Data (Text)
JTWC Best Track Data of Super Typhoon 26W (Nida)
26W.NIDA from the U.S. Naval Research Laboratory

2009 Pacific typhoon season
Typhoons
Nida